Horseshoe Bend may refer to:

Places

Australia
 Horseshoe Bend, New South Wales, an inner city suburb in the City of Maitland in the Hunter Region
 Horseshoe Bend Station, a pastoral lease that operates as a cattle station in the Alice Springs region of the Northern Territory

United Kingdom
 Horseshoe Bend, Shirehampton, an  biological Site of Special Scientific Interest in Bristol, England

United States
 Battle of Horseshoe Bend (1814) in Alabama, a battle of the Creek War
 location of Horseshoe Bend National Military Park
 Horseshoe Bend (Arizona), a meander of the Colorado River in Arizona
 Horseshoe Bend, Arkansas, a city in Fulton, Izard, and Sharp counties in northeastern Arkansas
 Horseshoe Bend, California, a placer and hydraulic gold mining camp along the Merced River, now covered by the waters of Lake McClure
 Horseshoe Bend, Idaho, a city in Boise County, Idaho
 Horseshoe Bend, Texas, a census-designated place in Parker County, Texas
 Horseshoe bend of the Ohio River
 Battle of Horseshoe Bend (1832), a battle of the Black Hawk War which took place in Wisconsin

See also
 Horseshoe Curve (disambiguation)